Bilateral is the second studio album by Norwegian progressive metal band Leprous. It was recorded in Ivory Shoulder Studios and Juke Joint Studio by Vegard Tveitan and Heidi Solberg Tveitan, and mixed and mastered at Fascination Street Studio by Jens Bogren. Additional editing by Ivar Barstad. Art direction and design by Ritxi Ostáriz. Cover painting by Jeff Jordan. All songs published by Magic Art Publishing.

In order to define the band's vision about music and what it means to be progressive, guitarist Tor Oddmund Shurke provided his insight on this matter and other subjects in an interview with the monthly music magazine Guitar World.

The album features guest vocals by Ihsahn on the 4th track of the album, "Thorn", and the trumpet on "Thorn" and "Painful Detour" are played by Vegard Sandbukt. Trumpet and additional keyboards were recorded in Kulturkirken Jacob, in Oslo by Rune Børø.

Track listing

Personnel 
Leprous
 Einar Solberg – vocals, keyboards
 Tor Oddmund Suhrke – guitars
 Øystein Landsverk – guitars
 Rein Blomquist – bass guitar
 Tobias Ørnes Andersen – drums

Other musicians
 Ihsahn – vocals on "Thorn"
 Vegard Sandbukt – trumpet on "Thorn" and "Painful Detour"
 Jens Bogren – mixing and mastering

References

External links

2011 albums
Leprous albums
Inside Out Music albums